Mourad Rahmouni (born 3 December 1963) is an Algerian footballer. He played in 17 matches for the Algeria national football team from 1988 to 1992. He was also named in Algeria's squad for the 1992 African Cup of Nations tournament.

References

External links
 

1963 births
Living people
Algerian footballers
Algeria international footballers
1992 African Cup of Nations players
Association football defenders
21st-century Algerian people